Neil Roberts is an English actor, known for portraying Rex Buckland in Charmed, Gavin Arnold in Family Affairs, Richard in Life Bites, DS Jason Wise in Emmerdale and Glenn Donovan in Hollyoaks.

Life and career
Roberts trained at the Bristol Old Vic Theatre School; following his graduation, he played the titular role in various productions of Hamlet. Roberts' credits include secret agent Max Meltus in the television advertisements for cough medicine Meltus, and a 1998 commercial for Nescafé Gold Blend, opposite Simone Bendix in the last Gold Blend couple ads. From 2016 to 2020, he appeared in the ITV soap opera Emmerdale as DS Jason Wise. In 2016, he appeared in an episode of the BBC soap opera Doctors as Ricky Delaine. He returned to the role in 2021. In 2017, Roberts appeared in the Channel 4 soap opera Hollyoaks as Glenn Donovan. Roberts married actress Dianne Pilkington in September 2020.

Filmography

Television

Film

Theatre credits

References

External links
 
 

Living people
Alumni of Bristol Old Vic Theatre School
English male soap opera actors
English male film actors
English male stage actors
English male voice actors
20th-century English male actors
21st-century English male actors
Year of birth missing (living people)